Chatham Manufacturing Mill was built by the Chatham Manufacturing Company. The former textile mill is located in Winston-Salem in North Carolina.

History
The Chatham Manufacturing Company was founded in 1877 in Elkin North Carolina. The original Mill was on Elkin Creek, but moved alongside the Yadkin River to take advantage of the railroad.

Growth
A second factory would be built in Winston-Salem, North Carolina in 1907 and expanded through 1951. The factory complex consists of a series of interconnected one to five-story heavy timber frame, brick, steel, and concrete industrial buildings. The complex also includes a coal trestle (1907); two small buildings erected in the 1940s (a brick fire pump house and a concrete block workshop); an electrical substation (1948-1954); and a one-story brick office building (1937).  The Chatham Manufacturing Company consolidated its operations at Elkin in 1940, and the Winston-Salem plant was subsequently purchased by the United States Government.  It was occupied by National Carbon Company (1943-1945) and Western Electric (1946-1966), who manufactured equipment for the United States military.

The Winston-Salem complex was listed on the National Register of Historic Places in 2011.

During the first part of the century the primary focus of company sales were blankets but by the 1930s the company started producing automotive upholstery.  By the 1980s the company had plants located in Eden, North Carolina and Charlotte, North Carolina along with the Elkin plant.

Current use
The mill complex has been redeveloped into luxury apartments.

References

Further reading
Powell, William S., The North Carolina Gazetteer: A Dictionary of Tar Heel Places, Chapel Hill: University of North Carolina Press, 
Powell, William S., Encyclopedia of North Carolina, Chapel Hill: University of North Carolina Press,

External links

Textile companies of the United States
Companies based in North Carolina
Surry County, North Carolina
Industrial buildings and structures on the National Register of Historic Places in North Carolina
Industrial buildings completed in 1907
Buildings and structures in Winston-Salem, North Carolina
National Register of Historic Places in Winston-Salem, North Carolina